Tsimakuridze is a Georgian surname. Notable people with the surname include:

David Tsimakuridze (1925–2006), Georgian wrestler
Giorgi Tsimakuridze (born 1983), Georgian football winger 

Georgian-language surnames